Jun'ya or Junya (written: , , , , , , , , , , , ,  or ) is a masculine Japanese given name. Notable people with the name include:

 Junya Enoki (born 1988), Japanese actor and voice actor
, Japanese footballer
, Japanese actor and voice actor
, Japanese manga artist
, Japanese architect
, Japanese footballer
, Japanese mixed martial artist
, Japanese swimmer
, Japanese politician
, Japanese footballer
, Japanese footballer
, Japanese video game composer
, Japanese footballer
, Japanese politician
, Japanese footballer
, Japanese programmer
, Japanese cyclist
, Japanese film director
, Japanese footballer
, Japanese footballer
, Japanese footballer
, Japanese footballer
, Japanese footballer
Junya Tashiro (born 1974), Japanese fashion designer
, Japanese fashion designer
, Japanese footballer
, science fiction writer and cultural historian

Japanese masculine given names